Hungary competed at the 1972 Summer Olympics in Munich, West Germany. 232 competitors, 187 men and 45 women, took part in 134 events in 20 sports.

Medalists

Gold
 András Balczó — Modern Pentathlon, Men's Individual Competition
 György Gedó — Boxing, Men's Light Flyweight
 Csaba Fenyvesi — Fencing, Men's Épée Individual
 Sándor Erdős, Csaba Fenyvesi, Győző Kulcsár, István Osztrics, and Pál Schmitt — Fencing, Men's Épée Team
 Imre Földi — Weightlifting, Men's Bantamweight
 Csaba Hegedűs — Wrestling, Men's Greco-Roman Middleweight

Silver
 András Balczó, Zsigmond Villányi, and Pál Bakó — Modern Pentathlon, Men's Team Competition
 László Orbán — Boxing, Men's Lightweight
 János Kajdi — Boxing, Men's Welterweight
 József Deme and János Rátkai — Canoeing, Men's K2 1000m Kayak Pairs
 Tamás Wichmann — Canoeing, Men's C1 1000m Canadian Singles
 Jenő Kamuti — Fencing, Men's Foil Individual
 Péter Marót — Fencing, Men's Sabre Individual
 Ildikó Bóbis — Fencing, Women's Foil Individual
 Ildikó Bóbis, Ildikó Rónay, Ildikó Schwarczenberger, Mária Szolnoki, and Ildikó Rejtő — Fencing, Women's Foil Team
 Andrea Gyarmati — Swimming, Women's 100m Backstroke
 Lajos Szűcs — Weightlifting, Men's Flyweight
 István Géczi, Péter Vépi, Miklós Páncsics, Péter Juhász, Lajos Szűcs, Mihály Kozma, Antal Dunai, Lajos Kű, Béla Váradi, Ede Dunai, László Bálint, Lajos Kocsis, Kálmán Tóth, László Branikovics, József Kovács, Csaba Vidács, and Ádám Rothermel — Football (soccer), Men's Team Competition
 András Bodnár, Tibor Cservenyák, István Görgényi, Tamás Faragó, Zoltán Kásás, Ferenc Konrád, István Magas, Dénes Pócsik, László Sárosi, Endre Molnár, and István Szívós, Jr. — Water Polo, Men's Team Competition

Bronze
 András Botos — Boxing, Men's Featherweight
 Géza Csapó — Canoeing, Men's K1 1000m Kayak Singles
 Anna Pfeffer — Canoeing, Women's K1 500m Kayak Singles
 Gyözõ Kulcsár — Fencing, Men's Épée Individual    
 Péter Marót, Péter Bakonyi, Pál Gerevich, Tamás Kovács, and Tibor Pézsa — Fencing, Men's
 Ilona Békési, Mónika Császár, Márta Kelemen, Anikó Kéry, Krisztina Medveczky, and Zsuzsanna Nagy — Gymnastics, Women's Team Combined Exercises
 Lajos Papp — Shooting, Men's Free Rifle, Three Positions
 András Hargitay — Swimming, Men's 400m Individual Medley
 Andrea Gyarmati — Swimming, Women's 100m Butterfly
 Sándor Holczreiter — Weightlifting, Men's Flyweight
 János Benedek — Weightlifting, Men's Featherweight
 György Horváth — Weightlifting, Men's Light Heavyweight
 Ferenc Kiss — Wrestling, Men's Greco-Roman Heavyweight
 László Klinga — Wrestling, Men's Freestyle Bantamweight
 Károly Bajkó — Wrestling, Men's Freestyle Light Heavyweight
 József Csatári — Wrestling, Men's Freestyle Heavyweight

Archery

In the first modern archery competition at the Olympics, Hungary entered one man and one woman. Their highest placing competitor was Hamvas Agnes Hajdene, at 22nd place in the women's competition.

Women's Individual Competition:
 Hamvas Agnes Hajdene — 2265 points (→ 22nd place)

Men's Individual Competition:
 Bela Nagy — 2302 points (→ 34th place)

Athletics

Men's 800 metres
András Zsinka
 Heat — 1:49.0 (→ did not advance)

Men's High Jump
Ádám Szepesi
 Qualifying Round — 2.15 m
 Final — 2.18 m (→ 5th place)

István Major
 Qualifying Round — 2.15 m
 Final — 2.15 m (→ 6th place)

Jozsef Tihanyi
 Qualification Round — 2.09 m (→ did not advance)

Men's Discus Throw
Géza Fejér
 Qualifying Round — 61.58 m
 Final — 62.62 m (→ 5th place)

Ferenc Tégla
 Qualifying Round — 60.60 m
 Final — 60.60 m (→ 7th place)

János Murányi
 Qualifying Round — 60.34 m
 Final — 57.92 m (→ 12th place)

Women's High Jump
Erika Rudolf
 Qualifying Round — 1.76m
 Final — 1.79m (→ 16th place)

Boxing

Men's Flyweight (– 51 kg)
 Sandor Orbán
 First Round — Lost to Orn-Chim Chawalit (THA), walkover

Men's Welterweight (– 67 kg)
 János Kajdi →  Silver Medal
 First Round — Bye
 Second Round — Defeated James Vrij (HOL), 4:1
 Third Round — Defeated Damdinjavyn Bandi (MGL), KO-2
 Quarterfinals — Defeated Maurice Hope (GBR), 5:0
 Semifinals — Defeated Richard Murunga (KEN), 4:1
 Final — Lost to Emilio Correa (CUB), 0:5

Men's Heavyweight (+ 81 kg)
 Jozsef Reder
 First Round — Lost to Ion Alexe (ROM), 0:5

Canoeing

Cycling

Four cyclists represented Hungary in 1972.

Individual road race
 András Takács — 23rd place
 Tibor Debreceni — 64th place
 Imre Géra — 67th place
 József Peterman — did not finish (→ no ranking)

Team time trial
 Tibor Debreceni
 Imre Géra
 József Peterman
 András Takács

Equestrian

Fencing

19 fencers, 14 men and 5 women, represented Hungary in 1972. Hungary finished top of the fencing medal table with eight in total: two gold, four silver, and two bronze.

Men's foil
 Jenő Kamuti
 Sándor Szabó
 László Kamuti

Men's team foil
 Sándor Szabó, Csaba Fenyvesi, László Kamuti, István Marton, Jenő Kamuti

Men's épée
 Csaba Fenyvesi
 Győző Kulcsár
 Pál Schmitt

Men's team épée
 Csaba Fenyvesi, Győző Kulcsár, Pál Schmitt, Sándor Erdős, István Osztrics

Men's sabre
 Péter Marót
 Tamás Kovács
 Tibor Pézsa

Men's team sabre
 Tibor Pézsa, Péter Marót, Péter Bakonyi, Tamás Kovács, Pál Gerevich

Women's foil
 Ildikó Farkasinszky-Bóbis
 Mária Szolnoki
 Ildikó Ságiné Ujlakyné Rejtő

Women's team foil
 Ildikó Ságiné Ujlakyné Rejtő, Ildikó Farkasinszky-Bóbis, Ildikó Schwarczenberger-Tordasi, Mária Szolnoki, Ildikó Rónay-Matuscsák

Football

Men's Team Competition
First Round (Group C)
 Defeated Iran (5-0)
 Drew with Brazil (2-2)
 Defeated Denmark (2-0)
Second Round (Group 1)
 Defeated East Germany (2-0)
 Defeated West Germany (4-1)
 Defeated Mexico (2-0)
Final
 Lost to Poland (2-1) →  Silver Medal

Team Roster
 László Bálint
 László Branikovits
 Antal Dunai
 Ede Dunai
 István Géczi
 Péter Juhász
 Lajos Kocsis
 József Kovács
 Mihály Kozma
 Lajos Kű
 Miklós Páncsics
 Ádám Rothermel
 Lajos Szűcs
 Kálmán Tóth
 Béla Várady
 Péter Vépi
 Csaba Vidáts

Gymnastics

Handball

Hungary's first two games resulted in victories over the United States and Japan, guaranteeing the team a berth in the second round regardless of the result of the third game. However, that loss to Yugoslavia carried over into the second round, putting the Hungarians at a disadvantage. Losses to Romania and West Germany put Hungary into last place in the division. The team played against Sweden for seventh and eighth places, losing 19–18.

Men's Team Competition:
 Hungary - 8th place (2-4-0)
 Roster - János Adorján, Béla Bartalos, János Csík, László Harka, József Horváth, Gyula Hurth, Sandor Kaló, István Marosi, Lajos Simó, János Stiller, István Szabó, László Szabó, Sándor Takács, István Varga, Károly Vass, and Sandor Vass

Judo

Modern pentathlon

Three male pentathletes represented Hungary in 1972. András Balczó won an individual gold while the team won silver.

Men's Individual Competition:
 András Balczó - 5412 points (→  Gold Medal)
 Zsigmond Villányi - 5047 points (12th place)
 Pál Bakó - 4879 points (15th place)

Men's Team Competition:
 Balczó, Villányi, and Bakó - 15348 points (→  Silver Medal)

Alternate Member: Peter Kelemen

Rowing

Sailing

Shooting

Nine shooters represented Hungary in 1972. Lajos Papp won bronze in the 300 m rifle, three positions event.

25 m pistol
 Szilárd Kun

50 m pistol
 Kornél Marosvári
 Pál Katkó

300 m rifle, three positions
 Lajos Papp
 Béla Nagy

50 m rifle, three positions
 László Hammerl
 Sándor Nagy

50 m rifle, prone
 László Hammerl
 Sándor Nagy

50 m running target
 Gyula Szabó
 István Jenei

Swimming

Men's 100m Frbeestyle
István Szentirmay
 Heat — 54.71s (→  did not advance)

Attila Csészéri
 Heat — 55.37s (→  did not advance)

Men's 200m Freestyle
Attila Csészéri
 Heat — DNS (→  did not advance)

Volleyball

Water polo

Men's Team Competition
Preliminary Round (Group B)
 Defeated The Netherlands (3-0)
 Drew with West Germany (3-3)
 Defeated Greece (6-1)
 Defeated Australia (10-2)
Final Round (Group I)
 Defeated Italy (8-7)
 Defeated United States (5-3)
 Defeated Yugoslavia (4-2)
 Drew with Soviet Union (3-3) →  Silver Medal

 Team Roster
 András Bodnár
 Tibor Cservenyák
 István Görgényi
 Tamás Faragó
 Zoltán Kásás
 Ferenc Konrád
 István Magas
 Dénes Pócsik
 László Sárosi
 Endre Molnár
 István Szívós, Jr.

Weightlifting

Wrestling

References

Nations at the 1972 Summer Olympics
1972 Summer Olympics
1972 in Hungarian sport